The 2015 Men's Ice Hockey World Championships was the 79th such event hosted by the International Ice Hockey Federation. Teams participated at several levels of competition, which also served as qualification for division placements in the 2016 Men's Ice Hockey World Championships and to finalize seeding for 2018 Winter Olympics qualification.

Championship

The top division championship took place from 1 to 17 May 2015 with the participation of sixteen teams. Czech Republic hosted the event with games played in Prague and Ostrava. Canada won the championship, defeating Russia in the final.

The IIHF's official final rankings of the tournament:

Division I

Division I A
The Division I A tournament was played April 19 to 25, 2015. Ukraine was to host the tournament, with some matches in Donetsk, but withdrew in advance due to "the political tension in the country being an obstacle for foreign visitors and fans who want to visit the ice festival in Donetsk." On 18 September 2014, it was announced that the tournament would be hosted in Kraków, Poland.

Division I B
The Division I B tournament was played in Eindhoven, Netherlands, from 13 to 19 April 2015.

Division II

Division II A
The Division II A tournament was played in Reykjavík, Iceland, from 13 to 19 April 2015.

Division II B
The Division II B tournament was played in Cape Town, South Africa, from 13 to 19 April 2015.

Division III

The Division III tournament was played in İzmir, Turkey, from 3 to 12 April 2015.

References

External links
IIHF Official Website

 
World Ice Hockey Championships - Men's
IIHF Men's World Ice Hockey Championships